General elections were held in Guatemala on 9 September to elect a new President and Vice President of the Republic, 158 congressional deputies, and 332 mayors. As no presidential candidate received a majority of the vote, a second round was held on 4 November.

Colom was elected President of Guatemala. It would mark the first time since 1954 that Guatemala had a left wing government.

Presidential and vice-presidential candidates
A full list appears on the Electoral Court's website.

Óscar Castañeda (VP: Roger Valenzuela) for the National Advancement Party (PAN)
Vinicio Cerezo Blandón (VP: Pablo Ramírez Rivas) for Guatemalan Christian Democracy (DCG). Cerezo Blandón is the son of Vinicio Cerezo Arévalo, who served as president from 1986 to 1991.
Álvaro Colom (VP: José Rafael Espada) for the National Unity of Hope (UNE). Colom was the runner-up in the 2003 presidential election.
Manuel Conde Orellana (VP: Juan Francisco Manrique) for the Democratic Union (UD)
Mario Estrada (VP: Mario Torres Marroquín) for the Nationalist Change Union (UCN).
Fritz García-Gallont (VP: Enrique Godoy García Granados) for the Unionist Party (PU).
Alejandro Giammattei (VP: Alfredo Vila Girón) for the Grand National Alliance (GANA). Giammattei served as director of the national prison service under GANA president Óscar Berger.
Pablo Monsanto (VP: Mariano Portillo Lemus) for the New Nation Alliance (ANN).
Rigoberta Menchú (VP: Luis Fernando Montenegro) for the Encounter for Guatemala (EG) party.  Menchú is a K'iche' Maya and Nobel Peace Prize laureate. Press reports in late August reported that she had withdrawn from the race because of financial constraints and low levels of support; these reports were false.
Otto Pérez Molina (VP: Ricardo Castillo Sinibaldi) for the Patriotic Party. Pérez Molina is a retired army general who was active in the Civil War.
Luis Rabbé (VP: Haroldo Quej Chen) for the Guatemalan Republican Front (FRG)
Héctor Rosales (VP: Carlos Pérez Rodríguez) for Authentic Integral Development (DIA).
Miguel Ángel Sandoval (VP: Walda Barrios Ruiz) for Guatemalan National Revolutionary Unity–MAIZE (URNG–MAIZ).
Eduardo Suger (VP: Erwin Lobos Ríos) for the Social Action Centre (CASA).

Opinion polls

Results

President
Around 60% of the voting public participated in the 9 September first-round vote. However, no candidate secured more than 50% of the vote, and so a run-off election was held between Álvaro Colom of the National Unity of Hope (UNE) and former Army General Otto Pérez Molina of the Patriotic Party (PP) on 4 November 2007.

The ruling Grand National Alliance (GANA), after placing third in the first-round vote, declined to endorse either Colom or Pérez Molina for the second round.

With 97.23% of the vote counted in the second round, Colom was declared the winner with just over 52 percent.

Congress
The National Unity of Hope (UNE) made huge gains in the election, gaining 20 seats. The Patriotic Party (PP), which ran independent of the Grand National Alliance (GANA), won 29 seat, while  GANA won 37 seats.

References

External links
Elecciones Guatemala 

Elections in Guatemala
Guatemala
General election
Presidential elections in Guatemala